Eastern Lane were an English indie band from Berwick-upon-Tweed, comprising Derek Meins (vocals/guitar), Andrew Lawton (guitar), Stuart Newlands (bass) and Danny Ferguson (drums). Their name was taken from a street in their hometown. The band was formed in 2001.

The band released two albums: Shades of Black in 2003 and The Article in 2005. Both albums are on the Rough Trade label. Their song, "Feed Your Addiction" was featured in an HSBC advertisement.

In late 2006 the band went their separate ways, according to a posting on the band's MySpace site, the split was down to the fact they have been unable to release any new material "due to circumstances with labels and money etc."

Derek Meins is now pursuing a solo career, performing and releasing as The Agitator.

Discography

Studio albums

EPs
Last Excerpt (2002)

Singles

References

External links
 
 

English indie rock groups
Musical groups established in 2001
Musical groups disestablished in 2006